Bordetella ansorpii is a Gram-negative, oxidase-negative bacterium from the genus  Bordetella which has been isolated from the purulent exudate of an epidermal cyst of an immunocompromised patient. A 16S rRNA gene analysis has confirmed B. ansorpii belongs to this genus.

References

Burkholderiales
Undescribed species